Hammatoderus maculosus is a species of beetle in the family Cerambycidae. It was described by Henry Walter Bates in 1880. It is known from Guatemala, El Salvador, Mexico, Honduras, Belize, and Nicaragua.

References

Hammatoderus
Beetles described in 1880